This article displays the rosters for the teams competing at the EuroBasket Women 2021. Each team had to submit 12 players.

Group A

Belarus
The roster was announced on 12 June 2021.

Slovakia
The roster was announced on 15 June 2021.

Spain
The roster was announced on 9 June 2021.

Sweden
The roster was announced on 12 June 2021.

|}
| valign="top" |
 Head coach
 Marco Crespi
 Assistant coaches
 Viktor Bengtsson
 Mats Levin

Legend
Club – describes lastclub before the tournament
Age – describes ageon 17 June 2021
|}

Group B

Greece
The roster was announced on 9 June 2021.

Italy
The roster was announced on 14 June 2021.

Montenegro
The roster was announced on 11 June 2021.

Serbia
The roster was announced on 15 June 2021.

Group C

Belgium
The roster was announced on 6 June 2021.

Bosnia and Herzegovina

Slovenia
The roster was announced on 14 June 2021.

}

Turkey
The roster was announced on 15 June 2021.

}

Group D

Croatia
The roster was announced on 14 June 2021.

Czech Republic
The roster was announced on 12 June 2021.

France
The roster was announced on 2 June 2021.

Russia
The roster was announced on 11 June 2021.

References

External links
Official website

Squads
EuroBasket Women squads